is a Japanese politician, the governor of Tottori Prefecture in Japan, first elected in 2007. He graduated from the University of Tokyo with the B.L. degree in 1984 and joined the Ministry of Home Affairs upon graduation.

References

External links 
  

University of Tokyo alumni
Politicians from Tokyo
1961 births
Living people
Governors of Tottori Prefecture